NGC 6789 is an irregular galaxy in the constellation Draco. It was discovered by Lewis Swift on Aug 30, 1883. It is located within the Local Void, a region of space with far fewer galaxies than its surroundings.

NGC 6789 is the nearest blue compact dwarf (BCD) galaxy to the Milky Way. It is chemically homogeneous and relatively metal-poor.

See also
 List of NGC objects (6001–7000)

References

External links

Irregular galaxies
Draco (constellation)
6789